Gregory Curtis Bell (born November 7, 1930) is a former track and field athlete who won the Gold Medal in the Long Jump at the 1956 Summer Olympics in Melbourne, Australia. He was born in Terre Haute, Indiana.

He won three national AAU championships, two NCAA Championships, earned NCAA All-American status three times and was a four-time national AAU All-American. From 1956–1958, he was ranked first in the world in the long jump. He set an NCAA record in the long jump, which stood for seven years, and is a charter member of both the Indiana Track and Field and IU Athletic halls of fame. 

Bell was inducted into the USATF Hall of Fame in 1988. Following his appearance in the Summer Olympics, he worked as director of dentistry at Logansport State Hospital for over 50 years and retired on 30 May 2020.

Championships
 1955 AAU: Long Jump (1st)
 1956 Olympics: Long Jump – 7.83 m (1st)
 1956 NCAA: Long Jump – (1st)
 1957 NCAA: Long Jump – 8.10 m (1st)
 1957 Penn Relays: Long Jump
 1957 Penn Relays: 100-meter dash
 1959 Pan American Games: Long Jump (2nd)

Honors
 1957 Penn Relays: Most Outstanding Athlete

References

External links 
 
 
 

1930 births
Living people
Athletes (track and field) at the 1956 Summer Olympics
Athletes (track and field) at the 1959 Pan American Games
Olympic gold medalists for the United States in track and field
American male long jumpers
Medalists at the 1956 Summer Olympics
Pan American Games medalists in athletics (track and field)
Pan American Games silver medalists for the United States
Sportspeople from Terre Haute, Indiana
Track and field athletes from Indiana
Medalists at the 1959 Pan American Games